Rev Henry Parr Hamilton FRS FRSE (3 April 1794 – 7 February 1880) was a Scots-born clergyman and mathematician, who was Dean of Salisbury for 30 years.

Life

He was born at Blandfield House, between Edinburgh and Leith, the son of Alexander Hamilton, Professor of Midwifery at Edinburgh University. He was educated at Edinburgh University and Trinity College, Cambridge, graduating BA in 1816 and MA in 1819.

He wrote two textbooks on analytical geometry, The Principles of Analytical Geometry (1826) and An Analytical System of Conic Sections (1828; 5th edn, 1843). He was elected a Fellow of the Royal Society in 1828 as "a gentleman well versed in mathematics", and was also elected FRS (Edinburgh) in 1822, as well as FRAS and FGS.

He became a curate in Cambridgeshire in 1825 and the rector of Wath near Ripon in 1830, becoming a rural dean in 1847. In 1850 he was appointed Dean of Salisbury, a position he filled until his death in 1880.

He took a great interest in children's education, delivering sermons and writing a book on the subject, Practical Remarks on Popular Education (1847).

He died at the Salisbury deanery in 1880.

Family

He had married Ellen Masson, daughter of Thomas Masson of Copt Hewick, Yorkshire, with whom he had one daughter, Katherine Jane.

His brother was James Hamilton FRSE (1767-1839).

References

1794 births
1880 deaths
People from Midlothian
Fellows of the Royal Society
Fellows of the Royal Society of Edinburgh
Fellows of the Royal Astronomical Society
Deans of Salisbury
Fellows of the Royal Geographical Society
Alumni of Trinity College, Cambridge
Academics of the University of Edinburgh
Alumni of the University of Edinburgh